Allenanthus hondurensis is a species of plant in the family Rubiaceae. It is found in Honduras and Mexico.

References

Guettardeae
Vulnerable plants
Flora of Honduras
Flora of Mexico
Taxonomy articles created by Polbot